Úri is a village and commune in Nagykáta District of Pest County in Hungary.

Populated places in Pest County